Moshe Idel (born January 19, 1947) is a Romanian-Israeli historian and philosopher of Jewish mysticism. He is Emeritus Max Cooper Professor in Jewish Thought at the Hebrew University, Jerusalem, and a Senior Researcher at the Shalom Hartman Institute.

Life and scholarship

Born in Târgu Neamț, Romania, on 19 January 1947. Idel was a precocious child, with a passion for reading which made him read all the books in the town, cooperative, then High school Library, in addition to buying more books with the money earned by singing at weddings.
Although the Holocaust did not directly affect the Jewish population of Târgu Neamț, they were affected by the so-called “population displacements”. In 1963 he immigrated with his family to Israel, settling in Haifa.

Enrolled at the Hebrew University, he studied under Shlomo Pines. After earning his doctorate with a thesis on Abraham Abulafia, he eventually succeeded Scholem to the chair of Jewish Thought.  He has served as visiting Professor at the Jewish Theological Seminary of America, UCLA, Yale, Harvard, Princeton, University of Pennsylvania and the Collège de France.

Idel has undertaken a systematic revision of the history and analysis of Jewish mysticism. His explorations of the mythical, theurgical, mystical, and messianic dimensions of Judaism have been attentive to history, sociology, and anthropology, while rejecting a naïve historicist approach to Judaism.
His 1988 work, Kabbalah: New Perspectives (Yale University Press), is said to have revolutionised Kabbalah studies. His historical and phenomenological studies of rabbinic, philosophic, kabbalistic, and Hasidic texts have transformed the understanding of Jewish intellectual history and highlighted the close relationship between magic, mysticism, and liturgy. He is also a three-time fellow at the University of Pennsylvania's Katz Center for Advanced Judaic Studies.

Awards
In 1999, Idel was awarded the Israel Prize for excellent achievement in the field of Jewish philosophy, and in 2002 the EMET Prize for Jewish Thought. In 2003, he received the Koret Award for Jewish philosophy for his book Absorbing Perfections. He has been conferred honorary doctorates by the universities of Yale, Budapest, Haifa, Cluj, Iasi and Bucharest. In 1993, he received the Bialik Prize for Jewish thought.

Book awards 

 1989: National Jewish Book Award in Scholarship for Kabbalah: New Perspectives
 2007: National Jewish Book Award in Scholarship for Ben: sonship and Jewish mysticism

Works
The following is a list of Idel’s publications in English.
 Kabbalah: New Perspectives (Yale University Press, New Haven and London, 1988).
 The Mystical Experience in Abraham Abulafia (tr. from the Hebrew by Jonathan Chipman. Albany, State University of New York Press, 1988).
 Studies in Ecstatic Kabbalah [Albany, N.Y., State University of New York Press, 1988]
 Language, Torah and Hermeneutics in Abraham Abulafia (tr. Menahem Kallus. Albany, State University of New York Press, 1989).
 Golem: Jewish magical and mystical traditions on the artificial anthropoid (Albany, State University of New York Press, 1990).
 Hasidism: Between Ecstasy and Magic (SUNY Press, Albany, 1994).
 Mystical Union and Monotheistic Faith, An Ecumenical Dialogue, eds. M. Idel, B. McGinn (New York, Macmillan, 1989; 2nd edn, Continuum, 1996).
 Messianic Mystics (Yale University Press, New Haven, London, 1998).
 Jewish Mystical Leaders and Leadership, eds. M. Idel, M. Ostow (Jason Aronson, Northvale, 1998).
 Abraham Abulafia, An Ecstatic Kabbalist, Two Studies (ed. Moshe Lazar, Labyrinthos, CA, 2002).
 Absorbing Perfections, Kabbalah and Interpretation (Yale University Press, New Haven, 2002).
 Ascensions on High in Jewish Mysticism: Pillars, Lines, Ladders (CEU, Budapest, 2005).
 Enchanted Chains: Techniques and Rituals in Jewish Mysticism (The Cherub Press, Los Angeles, 2005).
 Kabbalah and Eros (Yale University Press, New Haven, 2005).
 Ben: Sonship and Jewish Mysticism (Continuum, London, New York, 2007)
 Old Worlds, New Mirrors, On Jewish Mysticism and Twentieth-Century Thought (University of Pennsylvania Press, Philadelphia, 2009).
 Kabbalah in Italy 1280-1510 (Yale University Press, New Haven, 2011).
 Saturn’s Jews, On the Witches’ Sabbat and Sabbateanism (Continuum, London, New York, 2011).
 Mircea Eliade: From Myth to Magic (Peter Lang, New York, 2014).
 Representing God, eds. H. Samuelson-Tirosh, A. Hughes (Leiden, Brill, 2014).
 Vocal Rites and Broken Theologies: Cleaving to Vocables in R. Israel Ba'al Shem Tov's Mysticism (Crossroad, New York, 2020).

Students 

 Prof. Adam Afterman, Tel Aviv University
 Dr. Avishai Bar-Asher, Hebrew University 
 Prof. Jonathan Garb, Hebrew University
 Dr. Batsheva Goldman-Ida, Tel Aviv Museum of Art
 Dr. Iris Felix, Hebrew University
 Prof. Yuval Harari, Ben-Gurion University
 Prof. Boaz Huss, Ben-Gurion University
 Dr. Menachem Kallus, Haifa University
 Dr. Tsippi Kauffman z”l, Bar-Ilan University
 Dr. Zvi Leshem, Gershom Scholem Collection, National Library of Israel
 Dr. Esther Liebes, formerly Gershom Scholem Collection, National Library of Israel
 Prof. Ron Margolin, Tel Aviv University
 Prof. Zvi Mark, Bar-Ilan University
 Prof. Ronit Meroz, Tel Aviv University
 Dr. Elke Morlok, Goethe University
 Prof. Haviva Pedaya, Ben-Gurion University
 Prof. Daniel Reiser, Herzog College
 Prof. Michael Schneider z”l, Bar-Ilan University
 Dr Sandra Valabreque-Peri, researcher and artist
 Dr. Ron Wachs, Herzog College
 Prof. Tzahi Weiss, the Open University of Israel

See also 
 Rachel Elior
 Elliot R. Wolfson
 Yehuda Liebes
 Gershom Scholem
 Shlomo Pines

References

External links
 Faculty page at Hebrew University
 Faculty page at Shalom Hartman Institute

1947 births
Living people
Israeli historians
20th-century Romanian historians
21st-century Romanian historians
Jewish historians
Jewish philosophers
Religious studies scholars
Judaic scholars
Jewish mysticism
Kabbalah
Romanian philosophers
Romanian historians of philosophy
Philosophers of Judaism
Philosophers of religion
Academic staff of the Hebrew University of Jerusalem
Israel Prize in Jewish thought recipients
Israel Prize in Jewish studies recipients who were historians
Israel Prize in Jewish studies recipients who were philosophers
EMET Prize recipients in the Humanities
People from Târgu Neamț
Romanian Jews
Moldavian Jews
Romanian emigrants to Israel
Israeli people of Romanian-Jewish descent
Israeli Jews
Mysticism scholars